The vow of enclosure is a religious vow taken by some Poor Clares in addition to the three religious vows of obedience, poverty and chastity.

Description  
When a Poor Clare takes this vow, she may not leave the monastery except for doctor's appointments, civil duties, or emergencies. The sisters known as "extern sisters" do not take this vow in order to be able to handle some of the community's needs outside the papal enclosure.

The Poor Clares constitute the second branch of the Franciscan Order, founded in the thirteenth century by St. Clare under the inspiration of St. Francis of Assisi.

References 

Poor Clares
1212 establishments in Europe
Enclosure
Living arrangements